RaceCam is a video camera system used primarily in motor racing, which uses a network of car-mounted cameras, microwave radio transmitters, and relays from helicopters to send live images from inside a race car to both pit crews and television audiences.

History
Although a vehicle-mounted 16mm motion picture camera was used as early as 1973, the technology was first developed in the late 1970s by the Seven Network in Australia, who introduced it for the 1979 Hardie-Ferodo 1000 endurance race at Mount Panorama in Bathurst, New South Wales with Sydney-based driver Peter Williamson able to give commentary from his Toyota Celica.

RaceCam in Australia was unique in that the drivers were often wired for sound and able to converse with the television commentary team during races with top touring car drivers such as Dick Johnson, Allan Grice, Peter Brock and later Glenn Seton, Jim Richards, Mark Skaife, Wayne Gardner and Channel Seven's own commentator turned racer Neil Crompton all becoming regular users of the system. RaceCam (with drivers doing their own commentary) became a staple of Seven's Australian Touring Car Championship and Bathurst 1000 broadcasts during the 1980s and 1990s.

American audiences were first introduced to RaceCam at NASCAR's 1979 Daytona 500 on CBS network with Benny Parsons' Chevrolet Monte Carlo, and later at the 1983 Indianapolis 500, when ABC acquired the rights to use a streamlined version of the technology for their coverage of the race. The first Indy winning car with a RaceCam was that of Rick Mears in 1991.

Over the years, the camera location varied from "over-the-shoulder" in 1983, to rear-mounted (looking backwards) in 1988, nosecone-mounted in 1994, and rollbar/above-mounted in 1997. Later, the above-mounted cameras were improved to be able to rotate 360°. Other camera views have included the rear wing (just above the rear tyre), the gearbox, the driver's helmet ("Visor cam"), a "footcam" looking at the driver's feet (to illustrate the heel-and-toe shifting process in road racing), and a view from the sidepod. Additional mounting locations inside the cockpit gave a face view of the driver, but usually little or no view of the track. The "CrewCam" was another view, mounted on a pit crew member's hat or helmet, showing the point of view of a pit crew member performing his duties on pit road.

In the same time-frame, CBS and ESPN began using on-board cameras during NASCAR telecasts from different developers. The large, boxy interior of the NASCAR stock cars allowed modified, nearly regular-sized video cameras to be mounted in the cockpit. CBS used a remote controlled, 360° rotating camera, and 1984 Daytona 500 winner Cale Yarborough carried one to victory.

While Racecam units had become common place in NASCAR, unlike in Australian touring car racing the drivers generally refused to be wired to talk to the television commentators while driving, saying that it was too distracting. In a NASCAR first, at the 1988 Goodyear NASCAR 500 held at the Calder Park Thunderdome in Melbourne, Australia (which was also the first NASCAR race held outside of North America), Australian drivers Dick Johnson and Allan Grice talked to the Channel 7 commentators during the race. Johnson, who had been using Racecam since 1982, also created a first for American NASCAR viewers when he was able to talk to the ESPN commentators during the 1989 Banquet Frozen Foods 300 at Sears Point Raceway. When Johnson's car went off on oil during the race, he was famously caught dropping the F-bomb just before riding up a bank.  Typically in NASCAR, any conversations with drivers are done before the race, after the race, or during safety car periods as not to interfere with normal driver to crew communications.

Over the years, RaceCam has been refined and led to further developments. Besides the natural upgrades for high-definition television, the "Bumpercam" uses a camera mounted on the car's bumper. The "Roofcam" is a camera mounted on a car's roof, which gives a broader view, and a more authentic perspective of the driver's sightlines. Both systems are popular with NASCAR viewers. "Clearview" is another system, which removes grit and dust from the lens.

Formula One has also incorporates similar technology, with each car featuring a distinctive streamlined "camera pod" mounted above each car's airbox, giving video from a perspective similar to the driver's point of view, while also allowing a rearward-facing view for cars trailing behind. FIA regulations mandate that a total of five cameras (or dummy camera housings) must be mounted on the car, in a choice of several predetermined positions.

In IndyCar, all cars in the field are equipped with multiple "camera pod" housing units - one each above the roll bar, one embedded within the front nosecone, one in the aeroscreen, and in previous season, one the rear wing, and inside one of the rear-view mirrors - regardless if they are actually carrying cameras in those locations. This rule is such that cars carrying cameras will not have an aerodynamic disadvantage (or advantage) compared to cars not carrying cameras. In addition, camera-less cars carry equivalent ballast in place of the cameras, to ensure all cars have equal weight characteristics.

Driver's Eye
In 2019, the FIA Formula E Championship developed a miniature camera titled "Driver's Eye", designed to fit within the padding of a drivers' helmet. Evolving out of FIA safety regulations disallowing professional drivers to mount GoPros or CamBoxes to their helmets during race weekends, the first trial was held at the 2019 Diriyah ePrix with Felipe Massa used as test subject. American motorsport apparel company Racing Force Group acquired the rights to the product and it has since been used in Formula One, NASCAR and the Supercars Championship.

References

Australian inventions
Auto racing equipment
Auto racing mass media
Cameras
IndyCar Series on television
NASCAR on television
Seven Network
Sports television technology